

Events 
 April 30 – Possible premiere of Johann Sebastian Bach's last St Mark Passion pastiche (BC D 5) at St. Nicholas Church, Leipzig.  In addition to two movements by Bach, he incorporates seven arias from George Frideric Handel's Brockes Passion HWV 48 into the work.
 October 4 – Schlosstheater Schönbrunn opens.
 Johann Sebastian Bach is presented to King Frederick II of Prussia in Potsdam; the king plays a theme for Bach and challenges the musician to improvise a six-part fugue based on it.
Luigi Boccherini goes to Rome to study the cello.

Classical music 
Maria Teresa Agnesi – Il restauro d'Arcadia (cantata)
Carl Philipp Emanuel Bach – Trio Sonata in F major, H.576
Johann Sebastian Bach  
Vom Himmel hoch, da komm ich her, BWV 769
Musikalisches Opfer, BWV 1079 (the Musical Offering)
William Boyce – 12 Trio Sonatas
Antoine Forqueray – Pièces de viole mises en pièces de clavecin (posthumously published)
George Frideric Handel – Judas Maccabeus (oratorio)
Jean-Marie Leclair – 6 Duos for 2 Violins, Op. 12
Jean-Philippe Rameau – La Dauphine (harpsichord piece).
Giuseppe Sammartini – 6 Concerti Grossi, Op. 5
Giuseppe Tartini – L'arte del arco (first set of 17 variations on a theme from Corelli's Op. 5) (attribution to Tartini in question)

Opera
Nicola Calandra – Lo Barone Landolfo
Geronimo Cordella – La Faustina
Johann Adolf Hasse 
Leucippo
La spartana generosa
Giuseppe de Majo – Arianna e Teseo
Jean-Philippe Rameau – Les Fêtes de l'Hymen et de l'Amour, RCT 38

Births 
February – Narciso Casanovas, Spanish composer (died 1799)
March 29 – Johann Wilhelm Hässler, German organist and composer (died 1822)
March 31 – Johann Abraham Peter Schulz, musician and composer (died 1800)
June 24 – John O'Keeffe, Irish librettist (died 1833)
June 26 – Leopold Kozeluch, prolific composer and teacher (died 1818)
July 23 – Faustino Arévalo, hymnographer (died 1824)
September 22 – Józef Wybicki, composer and poet (died 1822)
October 26 – Giovanni Mane Giornovichi, violinist and composer (died 1804)
November 24 – Felice Alessandri, Italian composer (died 1798)
 date unknown
Narciso Casanovas, Spanish monk and composer
Michael Ehregott Grose, Danish organist and composer (died 1795)
François Tourte, maker of violin bows (died 1835)

Deaths 
 January 2 – Jean-Féry Rebel, violinist and composer (born 1666)
February 2 – Francisco Valls, church composer (born 1665)
 February 26 – Johann Nicolaus Mempel, musician (born 1713)
May 26 – Robert Valentine – Baroque composer (born 1674)
 June 6 – Jean-Baptiste Barrière, cellist and composer (born 1707)
 June 19 – Alessandro Marcello, composer (born 1669)
 July 9 – Giovanni Bononcini, composer (born 1670)

 
18th century in music
Music by year